The S8 is a railway service of RER Vaud that provides hourly service between  and  in the Swiss canton of Vaud. The service operates every day of the week except Sundays. On weekdays, a limited number of trains continue from Payerne to Avenches. Swiss Federal Railways, the national railway company of Switzerland, operates the service.

Operations 
It does not run on Sundays. The rest of the week, it pairs with the  S9 for half-hourly service between Palézieux and Payerne.

History 
SBB introduced the S8 in December 2017. It operated on weekdays only. With the December 2021 timetable change, the S8 began operating on Saturdays as well.

References

External links 
 2022 timetable

RER Vaud lines
Transport in the canton of Vaud